In the United States, there are numerous institutions both public and private dedicated to teaching film either as a department in a larger university, or as a stand-alone entity. Colleges offering film degrees as part of their arts or communications curriculum differ from colleges with a dedicated film program, which offer degrees in multiple aspects of film making such as theory, directing, cinematography, and screenwriting.

There is also a distinction between film programs in private colleges and art schools, and purely for-profit institutions.

Active institutions

See also

Film school
List of film schools
Wikiversity Courses in Filmmaking

References

External links
List of 300+ US film schools at filmmaking.net
National Center for Education Statistics homepage

Lists of universities and colleges in the United States